Kiss the Goat may refer to:

 Kiss the Goat (Lord Belial album), 1995
 Kiss the Goat (The Electric Hellfire Club album), 1995